Lukyanovsky is a rural locality (a village) in Utyagulovsky Selsoviet, Zianchurinsky District, Bashkortostan, Russia. The population was 50 as of 2010. There is 1 street.

Geography 
Lukyanovsky is located 105 km southeast of Isyangulovo (the district's administrative centre) by road. Akdavletovo is the nearest rural locality.

References 

Rural localities in Zianchurinsky District